The 1998 Oregon State Beavers football team represented Oregon State University in the Pacific-10 Conference (Pac-10) during the 1998 NCAA Division I-A football season. Led by second-year head coach Mike Riley, the Beavers compiled a 5–6 record (2–6 in Pac-10, eighth), their first five-win season in 27 years.

Riley left after the season in January for the NFL's San Diego Chargers, and was succeeded by Dennis Erickson, previously the head coach of the NFL's Seattle Seahawks for four years, preceded by six seasons at the University of Miami. Four years later in February 2003, Erickson left for the NFL's San Francisco 49ers, and Riley returned to Corvallis as head coach.

Schedule

References

Oregon State
Oregon State Beavers football seasons
Oregon State Beavers football